Dreams of Endless War is the debut album by the Finnish melodic death metal band Norther. It was released on 18 July 2002 by Spinefarm Records. The songs; "Victorious One" and "Endless War" are demo songs from Warlord, while the song "Warlord" from the demo was renamed as "Endless War" and are identical tracks. "Released" was released as a single and made into a music video.

Track listing

Videography
The album features a video for the song "Released", which can be viewed here.

Credits

Norther

 Petri Lindroos − guitars, vocals
 Kristian Ranta − guitars
 Tuomas Planman − keyboards
 Jukka Koskinen − bass guitar
 Toni Hallio − drums

Other
 Mixed in October 2001 at Finnvox Studios by Mikko Karmila.
 Mastered in October 2001 at Finnvox Studios by Mika "Mikä" Jussila.
 Photos by Toni Härkönen.
 Illustration and logo by "tree-dwelling goblin" Janne Pitkänen.

References

External links
 Official Norther website

2002 debut albums
Norther albums